2-Methylacetoacetyl-CoA is an intermediate in the metabolism of isoleucine.

See also
 3-hydroxy-2-methylbutyryl-CoA dehydrogenase

Thioesters of coenzyme A